Thelymitra villosa, commonly called the custard orchid is a species of orchid which is endemic to Western Australia. It has a single erect, hairy leaf and up to twenty yellow flowers with reddish-brown markings.

Description
Thelymitra villosa is a terrestrial, perennial, deciduous, herb with an underground tuber with a single, erect leaf at the base of the flowering stem. The flowers are yellow with varying amounts of red-brown spots and blotches. The distinctive column is yellow, reddish or brown with a glandular mid-lobe and hairy lateral lobes which are joined to each other. Flowering occurs from September to November. The flowers are similar to those of the leopard orchid, Thelymitra benthamiana and the sun orchid Thelymitra sargentii but T. villosa is distinguished from them by its leaf, which is shorter, broader and hairy.

Taxonomy
Thelymitra villosa was first formally described in 1840 by John Lindley and the description was published in his book A Sketch of the Vegetation of the Swan River Colony. He also informally described it as "A very fine species with large, stellate, yellow flowers." The specific epithet (villosa) is a Latin word meaning "hairy".

Distribution and habitat
The custard orchid is endemic to the south western corner of Western Australia, occurring in the Avon Wheatbelt, Esperance, Geraldton Sandplains, Jarrah Forest and Swan Coastal Plain biogeographic regions. It grows in sandy clay, grey, white or yellow sand which is wet in winter.

Conservation
Thelymitra villosa is classified as "not threatened" by the Western Australian Government Department of Parks and Wildlife.

References

villosa
Endemic orchids of Australia
Orchids of Western Australia
Plants described in 1840
Endemic flora of Western Australia